Rabisha is a village in north-western Bulgaria, in Vidin Province and Belogradchik municipality.

Geography 
Rabisha village is located 45 kilometers from Vidin and 20 km from Belogradchik. It is also located on Archar river. Its population is about 300 people. The nearest train station is in the town of Dimovo, 11.4 kilometers from Rabisha.

The village is near the Rabisha lake and the Magura cave. The Magura cave in the largest cave in Bulgaria. It is 15 million years old. There are unique drawings in the cave from primaeval people. The drawings are about 5000 years old. The Rabisha lake is the biggest Bulgarian non-salt lake. There are a lot of fish in it.

Cultural and nature sights 
 The Magura cave, located about 1.5 km north of the village.

 An old school, built in 1835.
 Rabisha lake - perfect place for fishing.

 The Archar river that goes through the village flows into the Danube river.

Others 
There are two protected oak trees near Rabisha. They are over 300 years old, which makes them two of the oldest trees in Vidin region. The trees are tall, about 17 meters.

Near the Magura cave is located Magura Winery which produces high quality wine and champagne.

References

External links

Villages in Vidin Province
Belogradchik Municipality